Great Western Railway telegraphic codes were a commercial telegraph code used to shorten the telegraphic messages sent between the stations and offices of the railway.

The codes listed below are taken from the 1939 edition of the Telegraph Message Code book unless stated otherwise.

History
Although this early system fell into disuse after a few years, from 1850 a new contract with the Electric Telegraph Company saw double-needle telegraphs working at most stations on the line; these were replaced by single-needle machines from 1860. Although used primarily as a safety device to regulate the passage of trains, it was also used to pass messages between the staff. In order to do this quickly and accurately, a number of code words were used to replace complicated or regularly used phrases. The codes were changed from time to time to reflect current needs.

By 1922 most railways in the country had agreed on standard code words, although the GWR had an extended list of codes that could only be used within its own network. In 1943 all railways were brought into a single system of codes and the GWR special codes were discontinued.

Wagons

Note: many of these codes could have an extra letter to identify variations, such as Mink A (a  ventilated van), or Mink G (a  ordinary van). Most of these codes were painted onto the wagons for easy identification.

 Aero – airscrew wagon (from 1941)
 Ale – cattle wagon converted for beer barrels (from 1940)
 Asmo – covered motor car truck
 Beaver – flat truck
 Beetle – prize cattle wagon.
 Bloater – large fish van
 Bocar – covered truck for car bodies
 Cone – gunpowder van
 Conflat – flat wagon for containers
 Coral – glass wagon
 Cordon – gas reservoir truck
 Covcar – covered carriage truck
 Crocodile – well trolley

 Damo – covered motor car truck
 Fruit – fruit van
 Gadfly – aeroplane truck
 Gane – engineers rail truck
 Grano – covered grain hopper
 Hydra – passenger rated well truck 
 Loriot – machine truck
 Macaw – timber truck
 Mayfly – transformer truck

Mex – ordinary cattle wagon
 Mica – meat van
 Mink – covered goods van
 Milta – milk tank
 Mite – twin timber trucks
 Mogo – covered motor car wagon
 Morel – propeller truck
 Open – open wagon
 Parto – covered van with movable partitions

 Pollen – girder or boiler truck
 Rectank – trolley for machinery.
 Roder – flat truck for road vehicles (to 1935)
 Rotruck – road-rail truck for milk tanks
 Serpent – carriage truck
 Tadpole – open fish wagon
 Tevan – converted Mica for special traffic
 Toad  – goods brake van, which became the standard designs nickname
 Totem – armour plate and girder wagon
 Tourn – eight-wheeled open (to 1934)

Carriages

Note: many of these codes could have an extra letter to identify variations, such as Scorpion C (a  carriage truck), or Scorpion D (a  carriage truck).

 Beetle – special cattle truck
 Bloater – covered fish truck
 Catox – cattle box
 Chafer – invalid carriage
 Chintz – family carriage
 Chub – third saloon
 Cricket – composite carriage
 Emmett – brake third carriage
 First – first class carriage
 Gnat – slip coach
 Goliath – bogie open scenery truck

 Hydra – well truck for road vehicles
 Melon – brake third carriage
 Mex – cattle wagon
 Monster – scenery truck
 Paco – horse box
 Python – covered carriage truck
 Scorpion – carriage truck
 Siphon – milk van
 Snake – passenger brake van
 Termite – third class carriage

Road motor vehicles and trailers
 Brockhouse – 15 ton Brockhouse trailer
 Dido – four-wheeled trailer
 Dixton – 10 ton cartage motor vehicle
 Dyak – two-wheeled trailer
 Forton – 4 or 5 ton cartage motor vehicle
 Jason – tipping trailer
 Lydus – pipe trailer
 Mentor – six-wheeled trailer
 Nico – cattle trailer
 Numa – container trailer
 Sixate – 6 or 8 ton cartage motor vehicle
 Toner  – 1 or 1½ ton cartage motor vehicle
 Tooton  – 2 ton cartage motor vehicle
 Vibo – timber trailer

Standard phrases
The 1939 Telegraph Message Code book contains in excess of 900 code words (around half of which were standard codes also used by other railways) yet very few were the familiar codes seen painted on the side of goods wagons.  By using these codes long and complex sentences could be sent using just a few words.  Some examples of the codes representing phrases include:
 Adex – Advertised day excursion.
 Boyne – There is no water at the following station.  Instruct drivers.
 Chicory – Cannot trace delivery.  Wire full description, marks, and contents, and say who complains.
 Cynic – Can only offer ordinary service.  Wire what decided.
 Earwig – Following urgently wanted.
 Lough – Shunting horse ill.  Send relief.
 Osage – Send men here for undermentioned engine to leave at ...
 Palm – Report fully by next train with reference to delay.
 Smoke – Owing to fog in London Division restriction train service to operate in accordance with current fog-working notice.
 Stork – We have no trace of your invoice; send copy next train.
 Zola – Can you send engine and men to undermentioned station?  If so, state time leaving.

See also 
 Australian railway telegraphic codes
 Commercial code
 Great Western Railway wagons

References

Telegraphic codes
Telegraphy